Oskar Morgenstern (January 24, 1902 – July 26, 1977) was a German-born economist. In collaboration with mathematician John von Neumann, he founded the mathematical field of game theory as applied to the social sciences and strategic decision-making (see von Neumann–Morgenstern utility theorem).

Companies he served as founder/co-founder of included Market Research Corporation of America, Mathematica and Mathematica Policy Research.

Biography 
Morgenstern was born in Görlitz in the Prussian Province of Silesia. His mother was said to be a daughter of Emperor Frederick III of Germany.

Morgenstern grew up in Vienna, Austria, where he also went to university. In 1925, he graduated from the University of Vienna and got his PhD in political science. From 1925 until 1928, he went on a three-year fellowship financed by the Rockefeller Foundation. After his return in 1928, he became a professor in economics at the University of Vienna until his visit to Princeton University in 1938. In 1935, Morgenstern published the article Perfect Foresight and Economic Equilibrium, after which his colleague Eduard Čech pointed him to an article of John von Neumann, Zur Theorie der Gesellschaftsspiele (1928).

During Morgenstern's visit to Princeton University, Adolf Hitler took over Vienna during the Anschluss, and Morgenstern decided to remain in the United States. He became a member of the faculty at Princeton but gravitated toward the Institute for Advanced Study. There, he met von Neumann and they collaborated to write Theory of Games and Economic Behavior, published in 1944, which is recognized as the first book on game theory, a mathematical framework for the study of strategic structures which govern rational decision-making in certain economic, political, and military situations. In 2013, the University of Vienna relocated the Faculty of Business, Economics and Statistics and named the square Oskar-Morgenstern-Platz in his honor.

The collaboration between economist Morgenstern and mathematician von Neumann led to the birth of entirely new areas of investigation in both mathematics and economics. These have attracted widespread academic and practical interest since that time. In 1944, Morgenstern also became a United States citizen, and four years later he married Dorothy Young, with whom he had two children, Carl and Karin. In 1950, he was elected as a Fellow of the American Statistical Association. Morgenstern remained at Princeton as a professor of economics until his retirement in 1970, at which time he joined the faculty of New York University. Morgenstern wrote many other articles and books, including On the Accuracy of Economic Observations, and Predictability of Stock Market Prices with subsequent Nobel laureate Clive Granger.

Morgenstern died in Princeton, New Jersey in 1977. The archive of his published works and unpublished documents is held at Duke University.

In November 2012 a place in Alsergrund, Vienna was called "Oskar-Morgenstern-Platz"; it is the address of the Faculties of Economics and of Mathematics of the University of Vienna.

Mathematica 
In the late 1950s "Oskar Morgenstern and several of his
Princeton University colleagues" began a "small research organization."

Company names with which he, along with others, were involved as founders/co-founders included:
 Industrial Surveys Company, which later became Market Research Corporation of America
 Mathematica Inc.
 Mathematica Policy Research (MPR)

Bibliography 
 
 
 
 Morgenstern, Oskar (1972). "Thirteen Critical Points in Contemporary Economic Theory: An Interpretation," Journal of Economic Literature 10, no. 4 (December): 1184
 – reprinted in Selected Economic /writings by Oskar Morgenstern, Andrew Schotter, ed. (New York: New York University Press, 1976), p. 288.
 
 
 
 Morgenstern, Oskar (1976). "The collaboration between Oskar Morgenstern and John von Neumann on the Theory of Games". Journal of Economic Literature 14, No. 3 (Sep., 1976), pp. 805-816
 – reprinted in Theory of games and economic behaviour — Sixtieth anniversary edition. Princeton, New Jersey: Princeton University Press, p. 712. .

References

Sources

External links 

 The Limits of Economics; William Hodge and Company, London, 1937
 Oskar Morgenstern Papers, 1866–1992 and undated, Rubenstein Library, Duke University
 Oskar Morgenstern’s Contribution to the Development of the Theory of Games ; Andrew Schotter, Center for Experimental Social Science
 Theory of Games and Economic Behavior; Princeton University Press, Princeton, 1944
 
 Biography of Oskar Morgenstern from the Institute for Operations Research and the Management Sciences
 Oskar Morgenstern (in German) from the archive of the Österreichische Mediathek

1902 births
1977 deaths
People from Görlitz
People from the Province of Silesia
Emigrants from Austria after the Anschluss
Austrian people of German descent
American people of German descent
German emigrants to the United States
German economists
Game theorists
Princeton University faculty
Academic staff of the University of Vienna
Fellows of the American Statistical Association
Fellows of the Econometric Society
Distinguished Fellows of the American Economic Association
New York University faculty